Rocha is a Portuguese language surname. It literally means “rock” or “boulder” in Portuguese; for instance, “rochas sedimentares, metamórficas e magmáticas” means “sedimentary, metamorphic and igneous rocks”. It is also a topographic surname that is found in Portugal as “da Rocha” or simply Rocha, literally, "one who is from/of the rock". It could also be a Jewish-Portuguese Sephardic surname.

People with the surname
Alicia de Larrocha, pianist
Alvany Rocha, mathematician
Antônio Cavilhas Rocha, Brazilian chess master
Carlos Eduardo Rocha, mixed martial artist
Chuck Rocha, US political strategist
Coco Rocha (born 1988), Canadian supermodel
Dardo Rocha, an Argentine 19th-century politician
Diogo Rocha (tennis), Portuguese tennis player
Evaristo Rocha, President of Nicaragua in 1839
Geraldo Rocha Pereira, Brazilian footballer
Glauber Rocha, Brazilian filmmaker
John Rocha, Hong Kong born fashion designer
Juan Ramon Rocha, Argentine footballer-manager and former Panathinaikos FC player
Kali Rocha, American actress
Luis M. Rocha, Portuguese-American scientist
Martha Rocha (1932–2020), Brazilian model
Red Rocha (1923–2010), American basketball player and coach
Ricardo Rocha (disambiguation), multiple people
Paulo Rocha (disambiguation), multiple people
Roberto Carlos da Silva Rocha (born 1973), a Brazilian footballer more commonly known as Roberto Carlos
Simone Rocha, an Irish fashion designer
Vagner Rocha, mixed martial artist
Zack de la Rocha, lead singer of the band Rage Against the Machine

References

Portuguese-language surnames